Piegaro is a comune (municipality) in the Province of Perugia in the Italian region Umbria, located about 30 km southwest of Perugia. 
Piegaro borders the following municipalities: Città della Pieve, Marsciano, Montegabbione, Monteleone d'Orvieto, Paciano, Panicale, Perugia, San Venanzo.

References

External links
 Official website

Cities and towns in Umbria